Pattancherry is a village in the Palakkad district, state of Kerala, India. It forms a part of the Pattencherry gram panchayat.

History and related trivia
Earlier known as Bhattasreni.

The village has a Shiva temple, Ganesha temple, Vishnu temple, Ayyappan temple and a Devi temple.

Picturesque locations with lush green fields and salt of the earth people, Pattancherry is known for its serene natural beauty

Connectivity
The nearest railway station is the Palakkad Junction railway station, about 25 kms away.
Public bus service and auto services are available.
Pattancherry is about 22 kms from Palakkad.
Chittur is the nearest town which is approximately 6km away.
There is a South Indian Bank and an ATM present here

Demographics
 India census, Pattancherry had a population of 17,915 with 8,726 males and 9,189 females.
Agriculture, Toddy tapping, fish farms are the main income source of the people of the Panchayat.

Village center
Vandithavalam Junction

Schools
 GHSS Pattencherry
 KKMHSS Vandithavalam
 Govt High school Nanniyode
 Karuna School Chempottanpalam

References

Pattancherry